Estadio Altamira is the current stadium for the team Estudiantes de Altamira, which plays in the Liga de Ascenso. The stadium, which seats 9,581 people, is located in the port city of Altamira in the state of Tamaulipas.

History
The idea of constructing Estadio Altamira (initially called Estadio Deportivo Sur de Tamaulipas), was the initiative of the founder of the club, Enrique de Hita Yibale. The effort was done as a whole, along with the State and Municipal Authorities; and the Office of Urban Development of the Industrial Port of Altamira. On December 17, 2002, the construction was approved.

The construction began in January 2003, and it was billed as "modern and the only in his type in the whole Mexican Republic". The tribunes and the playing field are of European type, which allows that the sight of a comfortably seated fan should be excellent from any angle of the tribunes. Behind the north goalpost, a forum called "Foro Modelo", is in the shape of half a ball makes it more exclusive.

The stadium was inaugurated on October 19, 2003 during a match between Estudiantes de Altamira and Acapulco FC, corresponding to week 13 of the Apertura 2003 in the Mexican Primera A (now Liga de Ascenso). At the north goalpost, Carlos Alberto Rodríguez scored the first goal in the stadium's history. Altamira would eventually win the match 1-nil.

Probably the biggest game the stadium has hosted was on January 11, 2004, with the visit of Pumas UNAM and their head coach Hugo Sánchez. There was a full house for this pre-season friendly prior to the beginning of the Clausura 2004 tournament. The final score was 5-4 in favor of Pumas.

Characteristics and services
 Capacity: 9,581 spectators
 Type of grass: Bermuda
 Official field measurement: 105 x 68 m.
 Illumination system: 40 lights of 1500 watts
 Electronic scoreboard
 Areas for the teams
 6 Dressing-rooms: 2 Home, 2 Visitors and 2 Referees
 30 stadium boxes
 VIP Zone with special balcony
 Press Room
 Bleachers with seats
 Special zone for persons with disabilities
 Restrooms for Men and Women in the General, Preferable, and VIP zones
 5 storage areas

Foro Modelo
 Capacity: 2,000 spectators
 Shape of half a soccer ball
 Metallic structure
 PVC roof
 4 dressing rooms
 Restrooms and showers
 Private parking with capacity for 115 cars

Club Facilities
Within the same property as the stadium, the facilities of Estudiantes de Altamira consist of:
 Clubhouse with capacity for 28 players (bedrooms, restrooms, and showers)
 Bedroom for head coach
 Team offices
 Gymnasium and Jacuzzi
 Restrooms
 Natural grass practice field: 105 x 68 m
 Limited practice field
 Practice field to practice headers
 Kitchen and Dining room
 Team store
 Auditorium or classroom
 Medical office
 Dormitory "B" with capacity for 20 players
 2nd natural grass practice field: 102 x 61 m
 Fronton court
 7 on 7 soccer court
 Basketball court

References

External links
 Official Site of Estadio Altamira

Estadio Altamira
Sports venues in Tamaulipas